Events from the year 1724 in art.

Events
 Swiss artist Johann Caspar Füssli goes to Vienna to study painting.
 Charles-Antoine Coypel publishes his illustrations for Don Quixote in a deluxe folio in Paris.

Paintings
 Canaletto
 Grand Canal, Looking East from the Campo San Vio (Thyssen-Bornemisza Museum, Madrid)
 Grand Canal, Looking Northeast from Palazo Balbi toward the Rialto Bridge
 Piazza San Marco
 Rio dei Mendicanti
 Jan van Huysum – Bouquet of Flowers in an Urn (see image)
 Charles Jervas – Henrietta Howard, Countess of Suffolk
 Sebastiano Ricci
 Bathsheba in her Bath
 Repudiation of Agar
 Solomon adores the idols

Births
 January 16 – Per Krafft the Elder, Swedish portrait painter (died 1793)
 April 14 – Gabriel de Saint-Aubin, French draftsman, printmaker, etcher and painter (died 1780)
 June 7 – Franz Anton Maulbertsch, Austrian painter (died 1796)
 August 25 – George Stubbs, British painter, best known for his paintings of horses (died 1806)
 November 19 – Jacobus Buys, Dutch painter and engraver (died 1801)
 December 30 – Louis-Jean-François Lagrenée, French painter (died 1805)
 date unknown
 Antonio Baratti, Italian engraver (died 1787)
 Antonio Beltrami, Italian painter active in the late-Baroque and Neoclassic periods (died 1784)
 Jonas Bergman, Finnish painter (died 1810)
 Henry Blundell, art collector (died 1810)
 Benjamin Calau, German portrait painter who used an encaustic technique (died 1783)
 Ignazio Collino, Italian sculptor (died 1793)
 Suzuki Harunobu, Japanese woodblock print artist, one of the most famous in the Ukiyo-e style (died 1770)
 Gustaf Lucander, Finnish painter (died 1805)

Deaths
 January 12 – Felice Cignani, Italian painter from Bologna (born 1660), son of Carlo Cignani
 February 7 – Hanabusa Itchō, Japanese painter, calligrapher, and haiku poet (born 1652)
 February 23 – Lucas de Valdés, Spanish painter and engraver (born 1661)
 June 17 – Benedetto Luti, Italian painter of pastel portraits (born 1666)
 September 20 – David von Krafft, German-Swedish painter, nephew of David Klöcker Ehrenstrahl and his successor at the Swedish Royal Court (born 1655)
 October 25 - José de Mora, Spanish sculptor  (born 1642)
 November 11 – Jakob Bogdani, Slovak still-life painter (born 1660)
 date unknown
 Ferrante Amendola, Italian historical painter (born 1664)
 Philippe Bertrand, French sculptor (born 1663)
 Serafino Brizzi, Italian engraver of the Baroque period (born 1684)
 Sigismondo Caula, Italian painter (born 1637)
 Benoît Farjat, French engraver (born 1646)
 Pietro Paolo Raggi, Italian Caravaggisti painter of Bacchanal and landscape subjects (born 1646)
 Ezaias Terwesten, Dutch painter (born 1661)
 Franz Werner von Tamm, German-born, Italian painter (born 1658)
 Jan Pietersz Zomer, Dutch engraver, copyist, and art collector (born 1641)

References

 
Years of the 18th century in art
1720s in art